Lake Ianthe / Matahi is a lake located on the West Coast of New Zealand's South Island.  A number of small streams flow into the lake and it empties into the Wanganui River.  It is close to the coast and near the rural settlements of Pukekura and Hari Hari, and  runs along the eastern shore of the lake on its route between Ross and the Franz Josef Glacier.

The lake is popular for boating, swimming, and trout fishing.   In the early 20th century, a privately run bush tramway was established from the end of the New Zealand Railways Department's Ross Branch railway to logging interests in the Lake Ianthe area.  This bush tramway was closed in 1959 when the sawmilling operation that owned the line shut down.

Following the passage of the Ngāi Tahu Claims Settlement Act 1998, the name of the lake was officially altered to Lake Ianthe / Matahi.

References

External links 

West Coast Tourism, Area 7 - has some info on Lake Ianthe

Westland District
Lakes of the West Coast, New Zealand